LaRouche may refer to:

 Lyndon LaRouche (1922–2019), an American political figure
 The overall LaRouche movement, an international political and cultural movement
 The Worldwide LaRouche Youth Movement, which recruits people between the ages of 18 and 25
 Helga Zepp-LaRouche (born 1948), German political activist and widow of Lyndon LaRouche
  (born 1995), Canadian handballer
 Pierre Larouche (born 1955), Canadian hockey player
 Steve Larouche (born 1971), Canadian hockey player

See also 
 LaRoche (disambiguation)